Auburn Park is a planned railroad station on the South Side of Chicago serving Metra's Rock Island District. It will be located on the southeast corner of 79th Street and South Lowe Avenue.

History
The Chicago, Rock Island and Pacific Railroad operated an Auburn Park station at 78th Street from 1879 to 1978. The Metra station was expected to begin construction after two state bonds were approved in 2009; however, budgeting issues delayed the release of funds. The ceremonial groundbreaking of the station was held on September 30, 2019. As of June 2022, construction is estimated to be completed by 2024.

References

Metra stations in Chicago
Proposed railway stations in the United States
Former Chicago, Rock Island and Pacific Railroad stations
Railway stations in the United States opened in 1879
Railway stations closed in 1978
Railway stations scheduled to open in 2024